Kállay, or Kallay, is a surname. Notable persons with that name include:

 Kállay family, a Hungarian noble family
 Béni Kállay (1839–1903), Austro-Hungarian statesman
 Tibor Kállay (1881–1964), Hungarian politician
 Miklós Kállay (1887–1967), Hungarian politician
 Gyula Kállai (1910–1996), Hungarian Communist politician
 Gabor Kallai (born 1959), Hungarian chess Grandmaster
 Norbert Kállai (born 1984), Hungarian football player
 Foday Kallay, Sierra Leonian rebel group leader

See also 
 Kállai

Hungarian-language surnames